Kalinowski's chat-tyrant (Silvicultrix spodionota), also known as the Peruvian chat-tyrant, is a species of passerine bird in the tyrant flycatcher family. It is found in Bolivia and Peru. Its natural habitat is subtropical or tropical moist montane forests.

This bird was previously considered to be the subspecies of the crowned chat-tyrant (Silvicultrix frontalis). It is named after the collector, Jan Kalinowski.

References

Updates to Birds of the World: A Checklist by James F. Clements. Fifth Edition. 2000.

Kalinowski's chat-tyrant
Birds of the Bolivian Andes
Birds of the Peruvian Andes
Kalinowski's chat-tyrant
Kalinowski's chat-tyrant